is a song recorded by Japanese singer Shizuka Kudo for her fifth studio album, Rosette. It was released by Pony Canyon as the album's lead single on January 10, 1990. Although it was not officially released on vinyl, a few copies were produced for promotional use. Kudo performed the song on the 41st Kōhaku Uta Gassen, marking her third appearance on the program. In 2015, DAM asked their users to select their favorite Shizuka Kudo songs to sing karaoke to and compiled a top ten list; "Kuchibiru Kara Biyaku" came in at number six.

Background
The song is described as a retro-sounding pop number, reminiscent of Group Sounds. It was written by Gorō Matsui and composed by Tsugutoshi Gotō. Gotō and his Draw4 band members Satoshi Kadokura, Takeshi Fujī, Hiroaki Sugawara and Noriyasu Murase created the arrangement while Gotō produced the track. It is the first collaboration between Matsui and Gotō since "Koi Hitoyo". Lyrically, the song describes the temptation the protagonist reads on the lips of a potential lover she is being lured by. The opening line of the song is the familiar saying, which loosely translates to "wait a minute!". Matsui was inspired by Kudo making it her personal catchphrase at the time to write it into the song. Kudo has described Matsui as "observant", stating of her working relationship with him, "we only exchange emails once a year but he always knows exactly the right lyrics to write".

Cover version
In 2017, Yūichirō Umehara recorded a cover of the song for the Shizuka Kudo-as-sung-by male voice actors tribute album, Shizuka Kudo Tribute.

Chart performance
"Kuchibiru Kara Biyaku" debuted at number-one on the Oricon Singles Chart, with 119,000 units sold in its first week. It slid to number two the following week, then to number three, before rising to the top of the chart a second time on its fourth week. The single charted in the top 100 for a total of 18 weeks. The song ranked at number two on the monthly Oricon Singles Chart for the months of January and February 1990, bested first by Tatsuro Yamashita's "Christmas Eve" and then by Buck-Tick's "Aku no Hana". It ranked at number eight on the year-end Oricon Singles Chart.

Track listing

Charts

Certification

See also
 List of Oricon number-one singles

References

1990 songs
1990 singles
Oricon Weekly number-one singles
Songs written by Tsugutoshi Gotō
Songs with lyrics by Gorō Matsui
Shizuka Kudo songs
Pony Canyon singles